Millington is a village in Kendall and LaSalle counties in the U.S. state of Illinois. The population was 617 at the 2020 census down from 665 at the 2010 census,.

The Kendall County portion of Millington is part of the Chicago–Naperville–Joliet Metropolitan Statistical Area, while the LaSalle County portion is part of the Ottawa Micropolitan Statistical Area.

Geography
In the 2010 census, 245 of Millington's residents lived in Kendall County and 420 lived in LaSalle County. The actual boundary line of the counties is not clearly defined in town, although a road farther south, named "Sandhill Road" in Kendall County and "N. 4201 Rd." in LaSalle County, clearly shows the county line, especially in the winter, as LaSalle County is slower in plowing the road, while the Kendall County portion is somewhat clear.

It lies mostly on the southeast side of the Fox River, except for a neighborhood along Belle Rive Drive on the northwest side of the river.

Demographics

As of the census of 2020, there were 617 people, 257 households, and 190 families residing in the village. The racial makeup of the village was 92.54% White, 0.16% African American, 0% Asian, 0.97% American Indian and Alaska Native, and 4.86% from two or more races. Hispanic or Latino of any race were 4.38% of the population.

There were 257 households, out of which 38.5% had children under the age of 18 living with them, 53.3% were married couples living together, 4.3% had a female householder with no husband present, and 10.0% were non-families. 24.1% of all households were made up of individuals, and 5.4% had someone living alone who was 65 years of age or older. The average household size was 2.58 and the average family size was 3.01.

In the village, the population was spread out, with 26.4% under the age of 18, 5.7% from 18 to 24, 28.8% from 25 to 44, 33.2% from 45 to 64, and 10.0% who were 65 years of age or older. The median age was 37.5 years. For every 100 females, there were 145.2 males. For every 100 females age 18 and over, there were 144.9 males.

The median income for a household in the village was $74.063, and the median income for a family was $86,500. Males had a median income of $63,026 versus $32,500 for females. The per capita income for the village was $36,357. About 1.1% of families and 3.8% of the population were below the poverty line, including 3.5% of those under age 18 and 3.0% of those age 65 or over.

The community is served by the Newark Fire Department, the Kendall County Sheriff's Department (through the Newark Police), the Sheridan Volunteer Fire Protection District (for ambulance service).

The community is also served by Newark School District, (south of Pine Street in the community), Sandwich District 430 (north side of Pine Street to the border with LaSalle County and north of the Fox River), and Community District School District #2 (west of the LaSalle County Line, and south of the Fox River).

History 
In the fall of 1834 the nucleus of the village was begun when George Markley and Samuel Jackson staked out the first claim and built a log cabin on the river bank near the house where Sam Adams now lives(408 Church St.). They claimed some 600 acres on both sides of the river and the next spring the dam to furnish waterpower for a sawmill which was also begun in 1835. The mill was located on the south side of the river.

Samuel Jackson came from Pennsylvania. A loyal Democrat, he supported the presidential campaign of Andrew Jackson with such vigor that he wore the nickname of “General” for the rest of his life. He was a member of the County Commissioners Court of Kendall County when the new court buildings were built. He married Eunice Tubbs and their home was next door to her father’s, in the house later occupied by the George Sleezer family. He built the first fence at the cemetery, at a cost of $70.00, in 1844. The tool shed there was built in 1847, cost $35.00.
                 	  
 
The Millington Newark Cemetery is located on Church Street on the southern edge of the village, on top of the hill overlooking the village center. It is populated with over 3,000 graves, including a Revolutionary War veteran buried on the north side. There is a small chapel on the south side.

Local businesses include the Last Chance Saloon, Millington Auto, and Fox Paintball. The village has its own post office and park. The park sits on land that once surrounded the operating school. Now this building is used as the town hall where town meetings take place along with other public events. In the past few years, Millington has expanded across the Fox River. The Belle Rive subdivision contains several homes.

The town used to have a theme song that would be sung in elementary school: "The potatoes they grow small in Millington. The potatoes they grow small in Millington. The potatoes they grow small and we pick them in the fall. Oh, the potatoes they grow small in Millington."

Samuel’s brother, Jesse Jackson, came from Pennsylvania for a visit and was so pleased with the location that he bought out Markley’s interest and moved his family here in 1836.  His was the first frame house in Millington.

	That year the sawmill was completed and put into operation and the little community began to grow. It is said that for a decade the sawmill could scarcely keep up with the orders; sometimes being as much as six months behind, so great was the demand for building materials.

In 1837 Fletcher Misner moved down from Newark and started a blacksmith shop.  He was the perfect example of the “Village Blacksmith” -- a mighty man was he and he could do anything with tools, from shaping plows to building beautiful walnut furniture.  Millington grapevine says that he designed the first steel plow but failed to patent it and someone else got the credit. It is known that he experimented first with cast iron plows which worked when new but would not scour and three years later made the first wrought iron scouring plow. Wagons and all sorts of farm implements were turned out in his shop.

The first shop was a small two-story building and Iver Nelson, father of Mrs. O.H. Anfinsen, worked on the second floor as a painter of the wooden wheels and wagons. He did the fancy lettering and scrollwork, also. It is said that the flood of 1857 came into those upstairs windows where he was at work.

After a few years the business outgrew the first small building and Fletcher Misner moved his shop into the stone building still standing, next to Fred Leonard’s home (304 Vine St.), where he continued in business for more than fifty years. He was the youngest of the fifteen children of Henry A. Misner. His wife was Mary Jackson, daughter of Jesse Jackson and she taught a Sunday School class for years. Their house (307 Vine St.), where Engeser’s lived so long and which Siggemans remodeled, was the third to be built in the village. Fletcher’s grandson, also named Fletcher, lives in Anderson, Indiana and is a member of the Round Robin.

References

External links
Official website

Chicago metropolitan area
Ottawa, IL Micropolitan Statistical Area
Villages in Illinois
Villages in Kendall County, Illinois
Villages in LaSalle County, Illinois